The banded krait (Bungarus fasciatus) is a species of elapid snake found on the Indian Subcontinent, in Southeast Asia, and in southern China.

Although the banded krait is venomous and its bite may be deadly to humans, it is shy, primarily nocturnal, and not particularly aggressive, so its overall risk to humans is low.

Description 
The banded krait is easily identified by its alternate black and yellow crossbands all of which encircle the body. The head is broad and depressed and it is not distinct from the neck. The eyes are black. It has arrowhead-like yellow markings on its otherwise black head and has yellow lips, lores, chin, and throat. The tail is relatively small, about one-tenth the length of the snake.

Scalation: 15 dorsal scale rows at midbody; sub-caudal scutes undivided throughout, 23–39; middorsal row of scales (vertebrals) hexagonal & strongly enlarged, as broad as or broader than long; anal plate undivided. tail end blunt; distinct vertebral ridge down the back formed by the neural processes of the vertebrae; ventrals 200–234.

Bungarum Pamah was the name recorded by Patrick Russell of a specimen from "Mansoor Cottah", he also received specimens from Bengal. The scientific name of the genus is derived from 'bangarum' in Telugu (also in Kannada), meaning "gold", referring to the yellow rings around its body.

Distribution and habitat
The banded krait occurs in the whole of the Indo-Chinese subregion, the Malay peninsula and Indonesian archipelago, and southern China. The species is common in the states of West Bengal, Odisha, Mizoram, Assam, Manipur and Tripura of India, Nepal and Bangladesh, but becomes progressively uncommon westwards in India.

It has been recorded eastwards from central India through Bangladesh, Myanmar, Cambodia, Thailand, Laos, Vietnam, and southern China (including Hainan and Hong Kong), Malaysia and the main Indonesian islands of Borneo (Java and Sumatra), as well as Singapore.

In India, it has been recorded from Andhra Pradesh, Bihar, Chhattisgarh, Jharkhand, Madhya Pradesh, Maharashtra, Northeast India, Odisha, Tamil Nadu,  and West Bengal. It has recently been recorded from Hassan District in Karnataka, Chalkari, Bokaro District, Jharkhand, Trivandrum, Kerala and Amalapadu, Srikakulam District, Andhra Pradesh

Banded kraits may be seen in a variety of habitats, ranging from forests to agricultural lands. They inhabit termite mounds and rodent holes close to water, and often live near human settlement, especially villages, because of their supply of rodents and water. They prefer the open plains of the countryside. The banded krait has been found in Myanmar up to an altitude of 5000 feet.

Behaviour
Banded kraits are shy, not typically seen, and are mainly nocturnal. When harassed, they will usually hide their heads under their coils, and do not generally attempt to bite, though at night they are much more active and widely considered to be more dangerous then.

During the day, they lie up in grass, pits, or drains. The snakes are lethargic and sluggish even under provocation. They are most commonly seen in the rains.

Food
The banded krait feeds mainly on other snakes, but is also known to eat fish, frogs, skinks, and snake eggs. Among the snakes taken by banded kraits are:
 Sunbeam snake Xenopeltis unicolor
 Rainbow water snake Enhydris enhydris
 Red-tailed pipe snake Cylindrophis ruffus
 Chequered keelback Fowlea piscator
 Buff-striped keelback Amphiesma stolatum
 Rat snake or dhaman Ptyas mucosus
 Indo-Chinese rat snake Ptyas korros
 Cat snake Boiga trigonata.
 Russell's viper (Daboia russelii)
 Common krait (Bungarus caeruleus)

The prey is swallowed head first, after it has been rendered inactive by the venom.

Breeding habits
Little is known of its breeding habits. In Myanmar, a female has been dug out while incubating a clutch of eight eggs, four of which hatched in May. Young have been recorded to measure 298 to 311 mm on hatching. The snake is believed to become adult in the third year of its life, at an approximate length of 914 mm.

Venom
The venom of the banded krait mainly contains neurotoxins (pre- and postsynaptic neurotoxins) with  values of 2.4 mg/kg–3.6 mg/kg SC, 1.289 mg/kg IV and 1.55 mg/kg IP. The quantity of venom delivered averages out at 20–114 mg. Engelmann and Obst (1981) list the venom yield at 114 mg (dry weight). The major clinical effects caused by the venom of this species include vomiting, abdominal pain, diarrhoea, and dizziness. Severe envenomation can lead to respiratory failure and death may occur due to suffocation. Banded krait venom can damage the kidneys if injected.

A clinical toxicology study gives an untreated mortality rate of 1–10%, which may be because contact with humans is rare and when bites do occur, the rate of envenomation when biting defensively is thought to be very low. Currently, polyvalent antivenoms are available in India and Indonesia.

Common names
 Manipuri language - 
 Mizo language - , 
 Karbi language - , 
 Assamese language -  (শখা),  (শংখচোৰ),  (গোৱালা), 
 Burmese - ငန်းတော်ကျား 
 Hindi - 
 Indonesian - 
 Malayalam -  (മഞ്ഞവരയൻ)
 Marathi - , पट्टेरी मण्यार , 
 Odia -  (ରଣା)
 Tamil -  (கட்டுவிரியன்), yennai viriyan, yettadi viriyan
 Telugu -  (కట్ల పాము) or bangaru paamu (బంగారు పాము) meaning the golden snake
 Tulu - 
 Thai - , งูสามเหลี่ยม, meaning the triangular snake
 Vietnamese - 
Maithili- मैथिली- गन गुआर

Gallery

References

 Boulenger, George A. (1890), The Fauna of British India including Ceylon and Burma, Reptilia and Batrachia. Taylor and Francis, London.
 Daniels, J.C. (2002), Book of Indian Reptiles and Amphibians. BNHS. Oxford University Press. Mumbai.
 Knierim, Tyler., Barnes, Curt H., Hodges, Cameron (2017), Natural History Note: Banded Krait (Bungarus fasciatus) diet. Herpetological Review 48(1):204 · March 2017
 Smith, Malcolm A. (1943), The Fauna of British India, Ceylon and Burma including the whole of the Indo-Chinese Sub-region, Reptilia and Amphibia. Vol I - Loricata and Testudines, Vol II-Sauria,  Vol III-Serpentes. Taylor and Francis, London.
 Whitaker, Romulus (2002), Common Indian Snakes: A Field Guide. Macmillan India Limited, .

External links

 B. fasciatus at Thailand Snakes

Bungarus
Snakes of Asia
Reptiles of Bangladesh
Reptiles of Brunei
Reptiles of Cambodia
Snakes of China
Reptiles of India
Reptiles of Indonesia
Reptiles of Laos
Reptiles of Malaysia
Reptiles of Myanmar
Reptiles of Singapore
Reptiles of Thailand
Snakes of Vietnam
Reptiles described in 1801
Taxa named by Johann Gottlob Theaenus Schneider
Reptiles of Borneo